Alex Lincoln (born November 17, 1977) is a former American football linebacker for the San Francisco 49ers in the  National Football League.

Lincoln attended Murphy High School in Mobile, AL.  Lincoln later played college football for Auburn University, where he was roommates with Heath Evans, a fullback on the 2007 New England Patriots.  He was selected as the ninth pick of the seventh round in the 2001 NFL Draft. Mel Kiper Jr. had noted Lincoln in his list of top inside linebackers available in the draft.

Lincoln is general manager of Athletes' Performance Florida, located in Gulf Breeze, FL, on the Baptist Healthcare campus adjoining the Andrews Institute of orthopaedic surgeon James Andrews.

References

1977 births
Living people
Sportspeople from Meridian, Mississippi
American football linebackers
Auburn Tigers football players
San Francisco 49ers players